Loxaspilates densihastigera is a moth in the family Geometridae. It is found in Taiwan.

References

Moths described in 1983
Ennominae
Moths of Taiwan